The Evektor VUT100 Cobra (also called the VUT 100 and VUT-100) is a Czech light aircraft under development by Evektor-Aerotechnik, of Kunovice. The aircraft is intended to be supplied as a complete ready-to-fly-aircraft.

As of 2017 the manufacturer lists the aircraft as "in development".

Design and development
The aircraft features a cantilever low-wing, a four-seat enclosed cabin, retractable tricycle landing gear and a single engine in tractor configuration.

The VUT100 is a hybrid construction of metallic and composite materials. The VUT100 is stressed for +3.8/-1.52g in the normal category and +4.4/-1.76g in the utility category.

Although designed to European CS-23 and American FAR-23 certification standards, the VUT100 does not currently have a type certificate issued by the European Aviation Safety Agency or the Federal Aviation Administration.

Variants
Evektor VUT100-120i Cobra
Evektor VUT100-131i SuperCobra

Specifications (VUT100-131i SuperCobra)

References

External links

Single-engined tractor aircraft
Low-wing aircraft
Cobra